Getting Somewhere is the fifth studio album by singer/songwriter Allison Moorer. The album was produced by Moorer's new husband and fellow singer/songwriter Steve Earle and recorded in Nashville. Written on the road while touring with Earle, it saw her embrace a more pop sound and became her first album where the majority of songs were written solely by Moorer. She told PopMatters in 2004: "Some of the records I’ve made have had a lot of cooks, for lack of a better word. This one basically was just me and Steve, and I had written all the songs while he was around. We were on the road together, and so he had a ringside seat for the whole writing of it. So when we went in to make the record in December, it was kind of just a given what we were going to do."

Track listing

Personnel
 Rev. Brady Blade - drums
 Chris Carmichael - strings, string arrangements
 Steve Earle - guitar
 Feedback - guitar
 Jim Hoke - saxophone, horn arrangements
 Brad Jones - bass guitar
 Doug Lancio - guitar
 Allison Moorer - guitar, tambourine, lead vocals, background vocals

References

2006 albums
Allison Moorer albums
Sugar Hill Records albums
Albums produced by Steve Earle